Jiang Yiyan (born Jiang Yan on September 11, 1983) is a Chinese actress and singer.

Life and career
She was born as Jiang Yan in Shaoxing, Zhejiang province, China. When she was 15, she enrolled in Beijing Dance Academy to study dance and singing. In 2002, she was enrolled in Beijing Film Academy. While she was at college, she started her first role in the film One Summer with You as Li Mingxin.

Filmography

Film

Television series

Discography
I'm Still Here (我还在这里) 
Unable to Escape (插翅难逃)

References

External links
Official site
Sina blog

 

1983 births
Actresses from Shaoxing
Living people
Musicians from Shaoxing
Singers from Zhejiang
Chinese film actresses
Chinese television actresses
21st-century Chinese actresses
Beijing Film Academy alumni
21st-century Chinese women singers